Himeic acid A is a substance with chemical formula C22H29NO8.

References

Dicarboxylic acids
4-Pyrones
Amides